Forbush High School is a 9–12 school located in East Bend, North Carolina, United States. Typical enrollment ranges from 900–1000 students. It's classified as a NCHSAA 2A high school, in the Western Piedmont Conference.

Notable alumni 
 Mo Cowan, former United States Senator from Massachusetts
Terrie Hall, anti-smoking advocate

References

External links

Public high schools in North Carolina
Education in Yadkin County, North Carolina